Begampura is a neighbourhood in the Lahore District in Punjab, Pakistan. It is located near G.T road Lahore. The University of Engineering and Technology, Lahore is located in Begampura.

There are a number of mosques and graveyards adjoining Begampura Road, including the early 18th-century Cypress Tomb (also known as Saruwala Maqbara) and Begampura Mosque.

References 

Zones in Lahore
Populated places in Lahore District